The Silver Logie for Most Popular New Female Talent was an award presented at the Australian TV Week Logie Awards. It was first awarded at the 41st Annual TV Week Logie Awards ceremony, held in 1999. The award is given to honour a standout performance of a new female talent on an Australian program. It may or may not be her first television appearance, however it is her first major television role. The winner and nominees of Most Popular New Female Talent were chosen by the public through an online voting survey on the TV Week website. This award category was eliminated in 2014 and replaced by the gender non-specific category, Most Popular New Talent. Home and Away has the most recipients of this award, with a total of five wins, followed by Neighbours with two wins.

Winners and nominees

Multiple wins/nominations

See also
George Wallace Memorial Logie for Best New Talent
Graham Kennedy Award for Most Outstanding Newcomer
Logie Award for Most Popular New Male Talent
Logie Award for Most Popular New Talent

References

Awards established in 1999

1999 establishments in Australia